The Red Tilson Trophy is awarded annually by the Ontario Hockey League to the most outstanding player (MVP) as voted by OHL writers and broadcasters. It was donated by The Globe and Mail, and first awarded in the 1944–45 OHA season by the Ontario Hockey Association. Winners of the Red Tilson Trophy are nominated for the CHL Player of the Year award.

The trophy is named for Albert "Red" Tilson, (January 13, 1924 – October 27, 1944) a former Oshawa Generals player killed in service in World War II. Tilson was born in Regina, Saskatchewan to William and Mary Tilson. He was nicknamed "red" for his hair colour. He played two seasons for the Generals beginning with the 1941–42 OHA season, and won the J. Ross Robertson Cup both seasons. Tilson won the Eddie Powers Memorial Trophy in the 1942–43 OHA season as the top scorer in the league with 19 goals, and 38 assists. Tilson enlisted in the Canadian Armed Forces on May 27, 1943 at Kingston, Ontario. Tilson was a lance corporal in The Queen's Own Rifles of Canada R.C.I.C. Tilson was killed in action in the Netherlands, on October 27, 1944. Tilson is interred in the Adegem Canadian War Cemetery, near Maldegem, Belgium. The Generals retired his uniform #9 on November 12, 2006. The Red Tilson trophy resides in the Oshawa Sports Hall of Fame, in the Tribute Communities Centre.

Winners

List of winners of the Red Tilson Trophy.
 Blue background denotes also named CHL Player of the Year.

See also
 Michel Brière Memorial Trophy - Quebec Major Junior Hockey League Player of the Year
 Four Broncos Memorial Trophy - Western Hockey League Player of the Year
 List of Canadian Hockey League awards

References

External links
 Ontario Hockey League
 Elite Prospects - Award - OHL Most Outstanding Player (Red Tilson Trophy)

Ontario Hockey League trophies and awards
Awards established in 1945